The Jones-Willis House, at 321 Main St. in Brandenburg, Kentucky, was built around 1920.  It was listed on the National Register of Historic Places in 1984.

It is a concrete block house built by and for the Jones family who operated a concrete plant located next to the house.  It was deemed "architecturally significant as the best representation of a concrete dwelling in Brandenburg. The dwelling exhibits qualities of excellent workmanship and design."

References

National Register of Historic Places in Meade County, Kentucky
Houses completed in 1920
Houses in Meade County, Kentucky
Houses on the National Register of Historic Places in Kentucky
1920 establishments in Kentucky
Brandenburg, Kentucky